The 1983 Mr. Olympia contest was an IFBB professional bodybuilding competition held on September 24, 1983, at the Olympiahalle in Munich, Germany.

Results

Total prize money awarded was $50,000.

Notable events

Samir Bannout won the Mr. Olympia title in his fourth attempt
Chris Dickerson, the 1982 champion, did not compete

References

External links 
 Mr. Olympia

 1983
1983 in West German sport
1983 in bodybuilding
Bodybuilding competitions in Germany
1980s in Munich
Events in Munich
September 1983 sports events in Europe